Albatrellus piceiphilus is a species of fungus in the family Albatrellaceae. Found in Picea crassifolia forest in Gansu Province, China, it was described as new to science in 2008. Molecular analysis shows that it groups in a "Russuloid" clade with Albatrellus citrinus and A. ovinus.

References

External links

Russulales
Fungi described in 2008
Fungi of Asia
Taxa named by Yu-Cheng Dai
Taxa named by Bao-Kai Cui